The Shape of Grace is the second album by Out of the Grey, released on December 11, 1992.

Track listing

Personnel 
 Christine Dente – lead and backing vocals 
 Scott Dente – lead and backing vocals, acoustic guitars
 Jerry McPherson – electric guitars
 Charlie Peacock – acoustic piano, keyboards
 Jimmie Lee Sloas – bass
 Mark Hammond – drums
 Sam Levine – soprano saxophone, flute, recorder
 Vicki Hampton – additional backing vocals (9)

Production
 Charlie Peacock – producer 
 Peter York – executive producer
 Craig Hansen – engineer, mixing (3–10)
 Kevin B. Hipp – assistant engineer
 Garrett Rockey – assistant engineer
 Jay Schwartzendruber – assistant engineer
 Craig White – assistant engineer
 Rick Will – mixing (1, 2)
 Ken Love – mastering
 Simon Levy – art direction and design
 Ron Keith – photography
 Jeffrey Tay – stylist
 Robyn Lynch – hair, make-up 

Studios
 Kaleidoscope Sound, Bellevue, Tennessee – recording location, mixing location
 Sound Stage Studios, Nashville, Tennessee – recording location
 Studio at Mole End, Franklin, Tennessee – mixing location
 MasterMix, Nashville, Tennessee – mastering location

References

External links
Album information at CCMplanet.

Out of the Grey albums
1992 albums